

Films
This is a list of films which placed number one at the weekend box office for the year 2022 in Spain.

Highest-grossing films

In-year release

See also
 List of Spanish films — Spanish films by year
 List of Spanish films of 2023
 List of 2023 box office number-one films in Spain

References

2022

Spain